Albert Sukop (24 November 1912 – 9 May 1993) was a German footballer who played for Eintracht Braunschweig. He started his career with the youth team of Eintracht Braunschweig in 1924 and stayed with the club until his retirement in 1948.

Sukop was also capped once for the German national team, in a friendly against Estonia.

References

External links 
 

1912 births
1993 deaths
People from Peine (district)
Footballers from Lower Saxony
German footballers
Germany international footballers
Association football midfielders
Eintracht Braunschweig players